Gazza most commonly refers to Paul Gascoigne (born 1967), an English former footballer

Gazza may also refer to:

People
 Gazza (musician) (born 1977), Namibian musician

Nickname
Gary Moore (1952–2011), Irish musician
Valery Gazzaev (born 1954), Russian football coach
Gary Ablett Sr. (born 1961), Australian Rules footballer
Garry Kasparov (born 1963), world chess champion
Gavin Henson (born 1982), Welsh rugby player
Nathan Lyon (born 1987), Australian cricketer

Fictional
Argus Filch, from the Harry Potter series, known in Italian as Argus Gazza (magpie)

Places
Gazza, an alternate spelling for Gaza City or the Gaza Strip
Gazza, Tajikistan
Gazza (Mecca neighborhood), in Mecca, Saudi Arabia

Other uses
Gazza (fish), a genus of ponyfish
La gazza ladra, an opera by Rossini
Mon Gazza, a fictional planet in the Star Wars franchise
Gazza's Superstar Soccer, a 1989 video game endorsed by Paul Gascoigne
Gazza II, a 1990 sequel
Gazza (TV series), 2022 two-part documentary about Paul Gascoigne

See also
 Gaza (disambiguation)
 Jezza (disambiguation)
 Gasa (disambiguation)